This is a list of newspapers in the Maldives.

Leading online newspapers in Maldives

Dhivehi
 Dhen Online
 Vaguthu
 Mihaaru
 Sun Online
 Dhiyares
 Dhauru
 Adhadhu
 Avas
 Dhuvaafaru Live
 Huvadhoo News
 The PRESS
 Uthuru Online
 Hurihaa
 Dhiislam Online
 Vnews
 One Online
 PSM News
 Channel News Maldives (CNM)
 Dhuvas
 Addu Live
 Jazeera News
 Voice
 Aafathis
 Haftha
 Raajje.mv
 Maldives Business Standard
 Miadhu Daily
 AO News
 Thiladhun
 Feshun
 Iru Online
 MvNoos
 Hoara Online
 Fahuminet
 Dhidaily
 DhiStar
 Hathaavees Online
 Khabaru Online
 Sangu Mv
 Adhives Online
 Hama.mv
 Outreach.mv
 Xeetimes
 Tech News MV
 Iruvaru
 Ras Online
 Dhidaily
 Hali News
 Furathama
 Sandhaanu News
 Gaafu Online
 Express News
 Huvadhoo News
 Mendhuru Online
 Theeru
 Dhenme

English
 The Maldives Journal
 Maldives News Network
 Maldives Financial Review
 The Edition
 Avas
 Sun Online
 One Online
 Maldives Today
 PSM News
 Maldives Times
 Corporate Maldives
 Maldives Voice
 Raajje.mv
 Hotelier Maldives
 Maldives Insider
 Maldives Business Standard
 Maldives Business Review
 The islandchief
 The PRESS
 MVHOTELS.Travel
 Travel Trade Maldives (TTM)
 Coral Glass Media
 Coral Glass Market
 Thiladhunmathi Times
 The Times of Addu
 Ras Online
 Dhidaily
 Hotel Insider Maldives

See also
List of newspapers

Maldives
Newspapers